Ranum is a surname of Norwegian or Danish origin. Notable people with the surname include:

Edith Ranum (1922–2002), Norwegian crime fiction writer, novelist and playwright
Jane Ranum (born 1947), American politician
Marcus J. Ranum (born 1962), American computer and network security researcher
Roy W. Ranum (1898-1990), American politician

References

Surnames of Norwegian origin
Surnames of Danish origin